This is a list of all environmental publication lists.

List of environmental books
List of Australian environmental books
List of books about energy issues
List of climate change books
List of environmental journals
List of botany journals
List of entomology journals
List of environmental social science journals
List of forestry journals
List of ornithology journals
List of planning journals
List of scholarly journals in environmental economics
List of scientific journals in biology
List of scientific journals in chemistry
List of scientific journals in earth and atmospheric sciences
List of scientific journals in physics
List of scientific journals
List of environmental periodicals
List of wildlife magazines
List of environmental agreements
List of environmental reports
List of environmental websites

See also
Environment
Environmental Media Services (EMS)
List of environmental issues
List of environmental lawsuits